The Japan Cup Cycle Road Race is an annual professional road bicycle racing classic one-day race held in the city of Utsunomiya in Japan since 1992. The race usually held in October each year. It is sanctioned by the International Cycling Union (UCI) as a 1.Pro race as part of the UCI ProSeries.

History
The race is held since 1992 at a circuit around the Utsunomiya Forest Park where 1990 UCI Road World Championships took place.

Japan Cup was a round of 1996 UCI Road World Cup.

Since 2008, it was a 1.HC (hors category) race as part of the UCI Asia Tour.  It became 1.Pro race since the start of UCI ProSeries in 2020, although the race was canceled in that year due to the COVID-19 pandemic.

Since 2010, an exhibition criterium race Japan Cup Criterium is held in downtown Utsunomiya on the day before the UCI road race.

Past winners

References

External links

 
 
 Statistics at the-sports.org
 Japan Cup at cqranking.com
 

Cycle races in Japan
UCI Asia Tour races
Recurring sporting events established in 1992
1992 establishments in Japan
UCI Road World Cup races
Japan Cup